Nguyễn Gia Thiều (1741–1798), courtesy name Quang Thanh (光聲), pen name Đạm Trai (澹齋), formal title Ôn Như hầu (溫如侯), was a Vietnamese poet in the 18th century.

Biography
His best known work, the "Lament of a Royal Concubine" or "The Complaints of the Royal Harem" (Cung Oán Ngâm Khúc), is an example of song thất lục bát ("double seven, six eight") form of nôm poetry in the ngâm "lament" style.

References

External links

1741 births
1798 deaths
Mandarins of the Trịnh lords
People of Revival Lê dynasty
People from Bắc Ninh province
18th-century Vietnamese poets
Vietnamese Confucianists